Cheer Television Theatre (also known as TV Theatre) is an American anthology series and drama that aired on the NBC Television Network from May 30, 1954, through June 27, 1954.

The series aired on Sunday nights from 7-7:30 PM.

The series aired filmed dramas, most reruns from the Chevron Theatre, from the end of the primetime run of The Paul Winchell Show to the beginning of the 1954 version of College of Musical Knowledge.The series was produced by MCA Television. It was sponsored by the Procter & Gamble Corporation.

Episodes

Pablo's Well - May 30, 1954
The Chinese Stick - June 6, 1954
Pride of the Force - June 13, 1954
Man on the Bluff - June 20, 1954
The Boss Comes to Dinner - June 27, 1954

References

1950s American anthology television series
1954 American television series debuts
1954 American television series endings
English-language television shows
NBC original programming